Giuliano Victor de Paula (born 31 May 1990), sometimes known as just Giuliano, is a Brazilian professional footballer who plays as an attacking midfielder for Corinthians.

Club career

Paraná Clube saw Giuliano de Paula as a hot prospect for the future and signed him to his first professional contract on 13 February 2007.

In 2009, Giuliano de Paula was signed by Internacional, and made his debut on 2 November that year. On 18 August 2010, with his team mates, he won the Copa Libertadores. Beating Chivas 3–2 at home he also scored in the game.

Giuliano de Paula was signed by FC Dnipro Dnipropetrovsk for €11 million and registered officially on 2 March 2011. Paraná Clube later submitted a claim to FIFA Dispute Resolution Chamber for overdue solidarity contribution of €275,000 and upheld by the arbitration.

On 15 June 2014, Giuliano de Paula was transferred to Grêmio by €6 million, signing a contract until July 2018.

On 21 July 2016, he was sold to the Russian club Zenit Saint Petersburg for €7 million.

On 11 August 2017, Giuliano de Paula transferred to Turkish club Fenerbahçe.

On 20 August 2018, Giuliano de Paula transferred to Saudi club Al Nassr for €10.5 million.

On 5 October 2020, Giuliano de Paula returned to the Turkish Süper Lig, joining İstanbul Başakşehir.

On 16 July 2021, he signed with Brazilian two-time FIFA Club World Cup champions Corinthians, after rescinding with İstanbul.

International career
Giuliano de Paula has already been capped by Brazil at under-17 level, and Brazil under-20 as well, where he gained the Bronze Ball Award in 2009 FIFA U-20 World Cup as Brazilian team captain.

He debuted for the senior national team in 2010 after the South Africa World Cup, under coach Mano Menezes. His first game was against Iran on 7 October 2010.
He was placed on the preliminary squad for the 2012 Summer Olympics, but did not get a place in the final squad list.

He was called up to the standby list for the 2018 FIFA World Cup by coach Tite, after featuring prominently during the qualifying stages. He did not get a place in the 23-man final list, however.

Career statistics

Club

International

Honours
Internacional
Campeonato Gaúcho: 2009
Suruga Bank Championship: 2009
Copa Libertadores: 2010

Al-Nassr
Saudi Professional League: 2018–19
Saudi Super Cup: 2019
Brazil U20
South American Youth Championship: 2009
Individual
FIFA U-20 World Cup Bronze Ball: 2009
Copa Libertadores MVP: 2010
Europa League Team Of the Group Stages 2016–17
UEFA Europa League: Top Scorer 2016–17

References

External links

Giuliano profile. Portal Oficial do Grêmio.

1990 births
Living people
Association football midfielders
Brazilian footballers
Brazil youth international footballers
Brazil under-20 international footballers
Brazil international footballers
Brazilian expatriate footballers
Footballers from Curitiba
Expatriate footballers in Ukraine
Paraná Clube players
Sport Club Internacional players
Grêmio Foot-Ball Porto Alegrense players
Sport Club Corinthians Paulista players
Campeonato Brasileiro Série A players
FC Dnipro players
Ukrainian Premier League players
Brazilian expatriate sportspeople in Ukraine
FC Zenit Saint Petersburg players
Expatriate footballers in Russia
Brazilian expatriate sportspeople in Russia
Russian Premier League players
Fenerbahçe S.K. footballers
İstanbul Başakşehir F.K. players
Copa Libertadores-winning players
Expatriate footballers in Turkey
Brazilian expatriate sportspeople in Turkey
Süper Lig players
Saudi Professional League players
Al Nassr FC players
Expatriate footballers in Saudi Arabia
Brazilian expatriate sportspeople in Saudi Arabia